Jeon Sang-Guen (전상균; born February 28, 1981) is a South Korean weightlifter.  He competed at the 2008 and 2012 Olympic Games.  He did not finish in 2008 but came fourth in 2012.

References

1981 births
World Weightlifting Championships medalists
Living people
South Korean male weightlifters
Weightlifters at the 2008 Summer Olympics
Weightlifters at the 2012 Summer Olympics
Olympic weightlifters of South Korea
Asian Games medalists in weightlifting
Weightlifters at the 2010 Asian Games
Asian Games silver medalists for South Korea
Medalists at the 2010 Asian Games
20th-century South Korean people
21st-century South Korean people